This is a list of media in Buffalo, New York.

Radio 

Radio stations from Toronto can also be heard in some parts of the area. CJED-FM and CFLZ-FM have a city-grade signal of Buffalo and nearby suburbs, while the latter's transmitter is located less than 5 miles away from downtown. Rimshot signals from Rochester are also sometimes audible in Buffalo.

Energy Radio Buffalo previously operated a rimshot signal targeting Buffalo from Little Valley using the signal of WGWE; it continues to operate as a webcast.

Television 

Although no cable stations are currently, as of 2017, based in Buffalo, Charter Communications has an affiliate and news bureau in the city, as does Spectrum Sports (until its closure in 2017) and MSG Western New York. Channels that have previously been headquartered in Buffalo include Pinwheel/Nickelodeon (1979 to 1981), Empire Sports Network (1991 to 2005), and Bridges TV (2004 to 2012).

In addition, Buffalo residents can also pick-up stations from the neighbouring Greater Toronto Area with a suitable aerial antenna or cable subscription. CTV flagship station CFTO/Toronto and CBC flagship CBLT/Toronto are carried on Charter/Spectrum and Atlantic Broadband in the immediate Buffalo/Niagara Falls areas, according to their channel lineups.

Newspapers 

 Am-Pol Eagle (a Polish-American weekly)
 Artvoice (a weekly alternative newspaper)
 The Beast (a left-libertarian biweekly)
 Brainstream Media (an alternative right-libertarian newspaper covering local news and issues, serving most of the Buffalo metropolitan area as a printed newspaper for over one year,  now offered only online)
 Buffalo Courier-Express (ceased publication in 1982)
 Buffalo Latino Village (Puerto Rican-Latino newspaper published in Buffalo & Erie County) buffalolatinovillage.com 
 Buffalo Irish Times (an Irish-American bimonthly)
 The Buffalo News  (the region's main paper)
 The Buffalo Times (daily newspaper published in Buffalo & Erie County from 1921–1939)
 Buffalo Rising began as a monthly publication and is now solely online. 
 Business First of Buffalo (a weekly business publication)
 Community Papers of Western New York (the region's main community newspaper covering hyper-local news)
 Erie County Fire Blotter (a website that covers the Buffalo Fire Department and other fire departments in Erie County on a daily basis)
 The German Citizen (a German-American bimonthly)
 Loop (a monthly in-print and online publication catering to the region's LGBT community)
 Outcome Buffalo (a monthly gay, lesbian, bisexual and transgender – GLBT – newspaper serving the Buffalo Metro area)
 PoliticsNY.net (founded and run by Joseph Illuzzi until his death, an Internet and formerly print newsletter; now owned and operated by Republican political operative Michael Caputo)
 The Public (founded by former employees of Artvoice)
 The Record (the Buffalo State College student-run newspaper)
 South Buffalo Online  Covering the South Buffalo, West Seneca and Lackawanna area for community news and info 
 The Spectrum (the University at Buffalo student-run newspaper)

Magazines 
 Buffalo, published by The Buffalo News
 Buffalo Rising [online]
 Buffalo Spree
 CannaBuff Magazine
 Cornelia
 Loop
 No Boundaries
 Peach Mag
 Welcome 716
 WNY Heritage, quarterly historical publication

Film industry 
Though Buffalo is not a major center of film production, the Buffalo Niagara Film Commission exists to promote and assist with filmmaking in the area. The non-profit Buffalo International Film Festival helps to highlight the work of Buffalonians associated with the film industry. Squeaky Wheel, a non-profit media arts center, provides access for local media artists to video and film equipment, as well as screenings of independent and avant-garde films.

Films set, or filmed, in the Buffalo area

A number films have been set or filmed in the Buffalo area. A more complete list of films related to or based in Buffalo can be found at IMDb.
 After the Sun Fell – set and filmed in Buffalo, Niagara Falls, and the surrounding area.
 The American Side (2016) – set and filmed in Buffalo, Niagara Falls, and the surrounding area.
 A Quiet Place Part II (2020) – filmed in Buffalo, and the surrounding area.
 Battledogs – filmed in Buffalo
 Best Friends – filmed in Buffalo in 1982
Bruce Almighty (2003) – starring Jim Carrey and Jennifer Aniston; set in Buffalo; parts of the movie are set in the real-life TV station WKBW
 The Buddy Holly Story – depicts the name "The Crickets" being bestowed upon Buddy's group by Buffalo disk jockey 'Madman' Mancuso
 Buffalo '66 – set and filmed in Buffalo
 Buffalo Bushido – set and filmed in Buffalo in 2007
 Canadian Bacon – although largely set in nearby Niagara Falls, had significant scenes in Buffalo
 Category 7: The End of the World – Buffalo is destroyed by tornadoes
 Crimson Peak – The beginning of the film is set in Buffalo in 1901
 Evan Almighty – beginning of the movie was set in Buffalo
 The Falls – shot in and takes place in Buffalo
 Henry's Crime (2010) – romantic comedy produced by and starring Keanu Reeves; takes place in Buffalo; features Reeves's character robbing the Buffalo Savings Bank
 Hide in Plain Sight – set and filmed in Buffalo
 Jump Tomorrow – filmed in Buffalo in 2001
 Limestone Burning – set in Buffalo and Niagara Falls, and was filmed on location in 2012
 Manna from Heaven – set and filmed in Buffalo
 The Natural – while not set in Buffalo, was mostly filmed there
 Nightmare Alley – set in Buffalo, and parts were filmed in Buffalo right before the Covid-19 Pandemic
 Planes, Trains & Automobiles – starring Steve Martin and John Candy; the automobile scenes were filmed along U.S. Route 219, south of Buffalo
 Poultrygeist: Night of the Chicken Dead – a Troma film shot in Buffalo at an old McDonald's location on Bailey Avenue
 Poundcake – set and filmed in Buffalo in 2006
 A Princess for Christmas – a Michael Damian film which takes place in Buffalo at the beginning of the movie.
 Prison of the Psychotic Damned – a horror picture which takes place in the old Buffalo Central Terminal
 Proud – filmed in Elmira and Buffalo in 2004
 The Savages – starring Philip Seymour Hoffman, filmed throughout Buffalo in the spring of 2006
 Second String – set in Buffalo
 Shadow Creature – filmed in Buffalo; directed by James Gribbins of Gribbins Films
 Sharknado 2: The Second One a (2014) made-for-TV movie was set in NYC but used several scenes filmed in downtown Buffalo
 Slime City – filmed in Buffalo in 1988
 Stepping Out – set and partially filmed in Buffalo
 Stiletto Dance – starring Eric Roberts as a Buffalo cop trying to foil a Russian mafia-nuclear weapon deal; set and filmed in Buffalo in 2001
 You Kill Me – half set in Buffalo, although it was mostly filmed in Winnipeg

TV shows set in the Buffalo area
Disco Step-by-Step (1977-1980) - dance television show - Taped live mainly at the Club 747 disco in Buffalo
Buffalo Bill (1983–1984)
Confessions of a Matchmaker (2007)
Cutters (1993)
Fraternity Life: Buffalo (2003)
Jesse (1998–2000) – starring Christina Applegate, based in and partially filmed in Buffalo
Off Beat Cinema
Good Deeds Buffalo
Super Fun Night – the lead character of the series is from the Buffalo suburb of Tonawanda; series is set in New York City
The Winner (2007)
At least 2 episodes of Supernatural have been set in or near Buffalo episode 6.08 and 3.03

References

External links
Buffalo Filmography: 170+ features films partially or entirely filmed or set in Buffalo; 220+ documentary films about the Buffalo area; and 100 television productions featuring the Buffalo area in some capacity. Compiled by The Buffalo History Museum.
Buffalo Broadcasters
Buffalo on American Radio Map (Radiomap.us)
Buffalo Newspaper Timeline: A chart of key Buffalo newspapers, color-coded for their relevance to major ethnic groups. Brought to you by the Buffalo & Erie County Public Library.
Buffalo newspapers, online and offline. Courtesy of BuffaloResearch.com.

Buffalo

Buffalo, New York-related lists